Viridiplantae (literally "green plants") are a clade of eukaryotic organisms that comprise approximately 450,000–500,000 species and play important roles in both terrestrial and aquatic ecosystems. They are made up of the green algae, which are primarily aquatic, and the land plants (embryophytes), which emerged from within them. Green algae traditionally excludes the land plants, rendering them a paraphyletic group. However it is accurate to think of land plants as a kind of algae. Since the realization that the embryophytes emerged from within the green algae, some authors are starting to include them. They have cells with cellulose in their cell walls, and primary chloroplasts derived from endosymbiosis with cyanobacteria that contain chlorophylls a and b and lack phycobilins. Corroborating this, a basal phagotroph archaeplastida group has been found in the Rhodelphydia.

In some classification systems, the group has been treated as a kingdom, under various names, e.g. Viridiplantae, Chlorobionta, or simply Plantae, the latter expanding the traditional plant kingdom to include the green algae. Adl et al., who produced a classification for all eukaryotes in 2005, introduced the name Chloroplastida for this group, reflecting the group having primary chloroplasts with green chlorophyll. They rejected the name Viridiplantae on the grounds that some of the species are not plants, as understood traditionally. The Viridiplantae are made up of two clades: Chlorophyta and Streptophyta as well as the basal Mesostigmatophyceae and Chlorokybophyceae. Together with Rhodophyta and glaucophytes, Viridiplantae are thought to belong to a larger clade called Archaeplastida or Primoplantae.

Phylogeny and classification
Simplified phylogeny of the Viridiplantae, according to Leliaert et al. 2012.
 Viridiplantae
Chlorophyta
core chlorophytes
Ulvophyceae
Cladophorales
Dasycladales
Bryopsidales
Trentepohliales
Ulvales-Ulotrichales
Oltmannsiellopsidales
Chlorophyceae
Oedogoniales
Chaetophorales
Chaetopeltidales
Chlamydomonadales
Sphaeropleales
Trebouxiophyceae
Chlorellales
Oocystaceae
Microthamniales
Trebouxiales
Prasiola clade
Chlorodendrophyceae
Chlorodendrales
Pedinophyceae
prasinophytes (paraphyletic)
Pyramimonadales
Mamiellophyceae
Pycnococcaceae
Nephroselmidophyceae
Prasinococcales
Palmophyllales
Streptophyta
Charophytes (paraphyletic assemblage of freshwater algae).
Klebsormidiophyceae
Phragmoplastophyta
Mesostigmatophyceae
Chlorokybophyceae
Charophyceae
Zygnematophyceae
Coleochaetophyceae
Embryophyta (land plants)

Cladogram

In 2019, a phylogeny based on genomes and transcriptomes from 1,153 plant species was proposed. The placing of algal groups is supported by phylogenies based on genomes from the Mesostigmatophyceae and Chlorokybophyceae that have since been sequenced. Both the "chlorophyte algae" and the "streptophyte algae" are treated as paraphyletic (vertical bars beside phylogenetic tree diagram) in this analysis. The classification of Bryophyta is supported both by Puttick et al. 2018, and by phylogenies involving the hornwort genomes that have also since been sequenced.

Ancestrally, the green algae were flagellates.

References 

Biological classification
Subkingdoms
Taxa named by Thomas Cavalier-Smith